The 1918 Texas A&M Aggies football team represented Texas A&M during the 1918 college football season. D. V. Graves coached the Aggies for a year while Dana X. Bible served in the war.

Schedule

References

Texas AandM
Texas A&M Aggies football seasons
Texas AandM